The Commerce de Paris was a 110-gun ship of the line of the French Navy, lead ship of her class.

Career 

She was offered to the French Republic by a subscription of merchants from Paris on 27 May 1803 and started as Ville de Paris. She was renamed Commerce de Paris on 21 November 1804.

In 1808, she served as flagship of the Mediterranean squadron under Vice-Amiral Ganteaume and Contre-Amiral Cosmao, with Captain Violette as her flag officer. In 1809, Ganteaume transferred on Majestueux. In June 1809, command of Commerce de Paris was transferred to Captain Brouard.

On 29 August 1814, after the Hundred Days, she was transferred from Toulon to Brest, along with Austerlitz and Wagram, where she was decommissioned.

From 1822 to 1825, she was razeed by one battery. In 1830, she was renamed Commerce, then Borda in 1839. She was used as a school ship from 1840, replacing Orion. Renamed Vulcain in 1863, she was eventually scrapped in 1885.

Sources and References

References

Bibliography

External links 

  Les bâtiments ayant porté le nom de Borda, Netmarine.net
 110/130-gun ships-of-the-line
 Fonds Marine. Campagnes (opérations ; divisions et stations navales ; missions diverses). Inventaire de la sous-série Marine BB4. Tome premier : BB4 1 à 482 (1790-1826), partie 2 

1806 ships
Ships of the line of the French Navy
Commerce de Paris-class ships of the line
Don des vaisseaux
Ships built in France